Mark Anthony "Gator" Rogowski (born August 10, 1966) is an American former professional skateboarder who was convicted of murder. He was mainly prominent in the 1980s and early 1990s. Rogowski's career ended when he pled guilty for assaulting, raping and murdering Jessica Bergsten in 1991. His life was chronicled in a critically acclaimed 2003 documentary titled Stoked: The Rise and Fall of Gator by American filmmaker Helen Stickler.

Early years
Rogowski was born in Brooklyn, New York, but he moved to Escondido, California, at the age of three after his parents divorced. Rogowski was a gifted athlete, playing little league baseball in his youth. Rogowski started to skateboard at age seven and, while most of his friends were into surfing, he eventually started to hang out at skate parks several years later. In 1978 after 2 years of skating local parks, 12 year old Rogowski was picked up by a local skate team.

Rise to prominence
Rogowski started his professional skateboarding career in 1980 at age 14. In 1982, he won his first major contest, the Canadian Amateur Skateboarding Championships in Vancouver, British Columbia, Canada. In 1984, he won a national championship. Rogowski soon received endorsement deals from Gullwing Trucks and G&S early in his career. He was the first skateboarder to receive his own 'pro-deck' by Vision Sports, and his pro-deck proved popular and was soon followed by the Mark Gonzales and Tom Groholski models. Rogowski was soon featured on the cover of Thrasher magazine for the first time in June 1984  and he would go on to be featured on the cover of Transworld Skateboarding in October 1985. He was featured on the covers of both magazines again in July & October 1987 as well.

At the height of his fame, Rogowski was being paid "between $4,000 and $8,000 a month" for clothing and skateboarding equipment endorsements. By 1987, Rogowski was earning two dollars per skate deck from Vision, which was selling 7,000 decks on a monthly basis, resulting in royalties totaling US$14,000 for Rogowski (US$  in ). Additionally, Vision was also selling T-shirts, berets, hip packs, and stickers using the "Gator" name.

Rogowski was one of a group of elite skaters who enjoyed significant fame in the 1980s, alongside Christian Hosoi, Tony Hawk, Lance Mountain and Steve Caballero. He was a charismatic, flamboyant personality who received fame and fortune during skateboarding's return to popularity following the success of vert skateboarding. 

In 1986 Rogowski was detained by police in Virginia Beach, VA after assaulting an officer in the parking lot of Mount Trashmore Park during the East Coast Assault pro contest. At a 1987 skate show in Scottsdale, Arizona, U.S., Rogowski was introduced to Brandi McClain and her good friend Jessica Bergsten, an aspiring model. Soon afterward, he began a tumultuous long-term relationship with McClain—they appeared together in numerous advertisements and promotional videos for Vision, which had become one of the top-selling skateboarding brands of the 1980s.

In late 1988 Rogowski was featured on the 'Swatch Impact Tour' which was 35 tour dates across the United States, which also showcased fellow pro-skaters Jeff Phillips, Kevin Staab, Chris Miller & Joe Johnson. In 1989 Rogowski also worked as a stunt double on the 1989 film Gleaming the Cube, which starred Christian Slater, and appeared, along with McClain, in the music video for Free Fallin' by Tom Petty.

Downhill slide
Rogowski's popularity declined as the 'vert skating' popular in the 1980s was supplanted by street skateboarding in the 1990s. Vision, the company he was with for the majority of his career, filed for chapter 11 bankruptcy. For re-invention, Rogowski changed his name to "Gator" Mark Anthony, explaining "Rogowski" was the name of the father he never knew.

After a severe accident in West Germany, where Rogowski either fell or was pushed from a hotel window and landed on a fence, Rogowski returned home to Carlsbad to recover. After befriending Augie Constantino, an ex-surfer turned born-again Christian who also became his "spiritual advisor", Rogowski converted to a strict Evangelical form of Christianity influencing Rogowski's attitude and skateboard deck designs. After four years of dating McClain, Rogowski suggested the couple marry, proclaiming they "can't have sex anymore unless we get married." The sudden lifestyle change contributed to the end of McClain's relationship with Rogowski, along with his occasional bouts of violence (which included his locking her in a closet) and unprovoked jealousy, and she returned to her parents' home in San Diego, California. Rogowski began a period of severe alcoholism following McClain's departure.

Murder of Jessica Bergsten
Following the end of his relationship with McClain, Rogowski was jealous: he entered her home to steal gifts he gave her; he made threatening telephone calls to McClain's new boyfriend; and he also threatened McClain directly. McClain informed police about Rogowski's behavior. They filed a report, but the situation was not monitored continuously.  

On March 20, 1991, Rogowski talked with 22-year-old Bergsten for the first time in years. Bergsten asked Rogowski to show her around San Diego. They spent a day together on March 21, 1991; shortly after, Bergsten was reported missing. According to Rogowski, he and Bergsten went back to his condo to watch movies, smoke weed  and drink wine. He admitted to coming up behind her and hitting her in the head with a Club (a metal auto anti-theft device). After knocking her semi-unconscious by way of several strikes, he handcuffed her and dragged her to his bedroom on the second floor, and raped her while she was shackled to his bed. Afterward, he placed her in a surfboard bag because he was concerned about the neighbors hearing the noise. Rogowski placed his hand over Bergsten's mouth until she stopped breathing, then drove the body to the Shell Canyon desert, then disposed of the corpse in a shallow grave.

Bergsten's body was found by campers on April 10, 1991, but it was so decomposed, it could not be identified. Plagued by guilt, Rogowski informed Constantino: "Remember that girl from the poster? She was the one I killed." Constantino encouraged Rogowski to confess his crime to the police, which he subsequently did.

Rogowski turned himself in on April 11, 1991, and led police to the grave of Bergsten's body. Police searched his home, and found evidence of blood soaked through the carpet padding and into the floorboards in two small spots, adjacent to where Bergsten's head allegedly rested. In his confession, Rogowski conveyed he killed Bergsten in a misplaced act of revenge toward McClain, calling Bergsten the "mold Brandi was made out of." Entering prison, Rogowski was diagnosed with bipolar disorder.

Hearing, prison, and parole
Rogowski was charged with "special circumstances," committing a murder during rape. Under California law, this warrants the death penalty or life imprisonment without the possibility of parole. His lawyer, John Jimenez, challenged the validity and content of the confession. Jimenez appealed the rape charge, insisting the decomposed body showed no signs of forcible rape, but the appeal was eventually dismissed.

Following the advice of his attorney, Rogowski pled guilty to first-degree murder and rape, thus avoiding the death penalty or life without the chance of parole. In January 1992, at the plea hearing, Gator submitted a four-page written statement. He accepted responsibility for his acts, accepted responsibility for sexual activities outside of marriage, for his promiscuity, and for not following the word of the Bible.

Rogowski was sentenced on March 6, 1992. Five uniformed bailiffs with metal detectors were at the hearing due to a rumor Stephen Bergsten (the father of the victim) would attempt to harm Rogowski. Bergsten lost two properties due to his involvement with a nationwide drug ring, and he allegedly had nothing to lose by harming Rogowski. With the bailiffs standing between Rogowski and Bergsten, Rogowski offered an apology while Bergsten shouted back he "was a coward" who would "die a thousand deaths".

Rogowski received a 31-year to life prison sentence: six years for forcible rape and 25 years to life for the first-degree murder charges to be served consecutively.

Rogowski was denied parole on February 7, 2011. Deputy District Attorney Richard Sachs argued Rogowski remains an "unreasonable risk to society" and should remain imprisoned, while a family member of Bergsten also attended the hearing and requested Rogowski remain incarcerated. On February 6, 2015, another parole hearing was scheduled, but Rogowski waived his right to a hearing for one year. On March 9, 2016, he was again denied parole for seven years.

As of June 2019, Rogowski is incarcerated at Donovan State Prison.

On December 10, 2019, multiple media reports indicated that Rogowski's parole board recommended parole. The California Board of Parole Hearings finalized the decision, and the case went before the California governor's staff for review. On April 27, 2020, Rogowski's parole grant was reversed by Governor Gavin Newsom, stating Rogowski needed to gain a "deeper understanding" of his crimes.

In June 2022, a San Diego County Parole Board granted Rogowski parole with his attorney citing "the parole board's 'trained psychologist found him to be a low risk of danger to the public.'" This was to be followed by a 120 day review period by the board, and then up to 30 days for the Governor to make a final decision. However, Governor Gavin Newsom again reversed the parole board's decision, ensuring Rogowski would continue to serve his sentence.

In media
A documentary examining Mark Rogowski's trajectory, Stoked: The Rise and Fall of Gator, was released in 2002 by Palm Pictures. The film was written, directed, and produced by Helen Stickler, and features interviews with other professional skateboarders such as Tony Hawk, Kevin Staab, Lance Mountain, Ken Park, Steve Caballero, Jason Jessee, Craig Johnson, Stacy Peralta, and Rogowski.  Since California law prohibits video interviews with prison inmates, Rogowski was interviewed over the recorded prison phone for the documentary, and gave details on his background, his downfall, and remorse for murdering Jessica Bergsten.

This story was featured on an episode of Shattered on the Investigation Discovery channel. It features interviews with the lead investigator, Brandy McClain, and the minister Auggie Costantino.

Contest history
Amateur:
 Top 5 at the Vans/Offshore Amateur State Finals (California) for the boys 11-13 division, 1980
 4th Place, Del Mar Freestyle Contest, 1982
 2nd Place, Whittier Freestyle Contest, 1982
 1st Place, Canadian Amateur Skate-boarding Championships, Vancouver, British Columbia, 1982
Pro:
 1st Place, Del Mar NSA Spring Contest, 1984
 6th Place, NSA Summer Series at Upland Skatepark, Upland, CA 1984
 5th Place, Terror in Tahoe, 1985
 5th Place, NSA 1 Houston, TX, 1986 
 4th Place, Del Mar Pro Jam 1986
 6th Place, East Coast Assault, Virginia Beach, VA, 1986
 7th Place, NSA Chicago Blowout, Chicago, IL, 1986
 3rd Place, Vision Ramp N' Rage Down South, 1987
 9th Place, Vision Street Wear US Skateboard Championships, 1988
 1st Place Tracker Bluegrass Aggression Session, Louisville, KY 1988

References

External links
 
 

1966 births
Living people
American people convicted of murder
American sportspeople convicted of crimes
American skateboarders
American rapists
People with bipolar disorder
People convicted of murder by California
Sportspeople from Brooklyn
Sportspeople from Escondido, California
Sportspeople convicted of murder